The Portland Korean Church was a historic Gothic-style church building in Portland, Oregon. The structure was built in 1905 and originally known as the First German Evangelical Church.

The building caught fire in September 2020 and in 2023, and was subsequently demolished.

References

External links
 

1905 establishments in Oregon
Buildings and structures completed in 1905
Buildings and structures demolished in 2023
Churches in Portland, Oregon
Demolished buildings and structures in Portland, Oregon
Destroyed churches in the United States
Gothic Revival architecture in Oregon
Southwest Portland, Oregon